State Road 378 (NM 378) is a  state highway in far northern New Mexico. Beginning at a junction with NM 522, NM 378 heads generally west through the small town of Cerro and officially ends shortly thereafter at the boundary of BLM lands. The paved surface continues a few miles further under a different designation to end at the BLM's Wild Rivers National Recreation Area.

Major intersections

See also

References

External links

378
Transportation in Taos County, New Mexico